Mojca Cater-Herman (born February 12, 1970) is a former butterfly swimmer from Canada.

Cater competed for her native country at the 1988 Summer Olympics in Seoul, South Korea.  There she finished in ninth position in the 200-metre butterfly, clocking 2:12.66 in the B-Final.

References

External links
 Mojca is a Therapist and owns her own Hand & Upper Extremity Therapy Clinic in Torrance, California
 Mojca also teaches swimming to children in Redondo Beach, CA
 Canadian Olympic Committee

1970 births
Canadian female butterfly swimmers
Living people
Olympic swimmers of Canada
Swimmers from Toronto
Swimmers at the 1988 Summer Olympics
Universiade medalists in swimming
Universiade bronze medalists for Canada
Medalists at the 1991 Summer Universiade
20th-century Canadian women